Sofitel Legend Metropole Hanoi is a five-star historic luxury hotel, opened in 1901 as Grand Métropole Hotel in Hanoi, the capital of Vietnam. It is today one of the most important buildings of Vietnam in French colonial style. The hotel today has 364 rooms.

History 
1900s

In 1899, Gustave-Émile Dumoutier files a request to convert the buildings on his land at the corner of boulevard Henri-Rivière into a hotel. The extra capital of 500,000 francs is provided by businessman André Ducamp. The Grand Métropole Hôtel is opened in August 1901 by André Ducamp and Gustave-Émile Dumoutier, operated by the Cie Française Immobilière. 

On 2 August in 1904 Gustave-Émile Dumoutier, partner of Andre Ducamp, dies. 
The hotel is managed by the professional manager, Frenchman Edouard Lion. It is regarded by visitors as ‚a luxurious, though expensive abode‘.

1910s

By 1916, the Metropole becomes the first venue in Indo-China to show motion pictures.

1930s

During 1930 and 1934 the global economic slump strikes the colony. By that time the Métropole company Française Immobilière has grown in to a hotel chain operating properties in Tam–Dao (Hôtel de la Cascade d’Argent), in Doson (Grand Hôtel de Doson), the ‘Wagons-restaurants des trains directs’ between Hanoi and Vinh – Hue –Tourane, the Grand Hôtel de Chapa (at 1,750m altitude, 325 km from Hanoi in the ‘Pyrénées Tonkinoises’) and the Hôtel des Trois Maréchaux at Langson (Tonkin).

1940s

In 1946 the French owners of the Métropole sell it to a Chinese businessman, Giu Sinh Hoi.

Ho Chi Minh used the Metropole at several occasions as a meeting place. In 1946 he entertained talks at the conference room with General Etienne Valuie and Vietnams politician Nguyễn Hải Thần, in the small wing where the lobby bar is located today. He occasionally used the hotel for meetings, officially again in 1960.

1950s

Following Vietnamese independence in the 1950s, the Metropole is renamed the Thong Nhat Hotel (Reunification Hotel) by the Communist government in 1954. From now on it acts as the official Vietnamese government guest house.

1960s

In 1964, with American air raids imminent, the management decides to construct a bomb shelter in the courtyard of the hotel to protect guests. It has a 1m thick concrete ceiling and could accommodate 30 – 40 people. During that time the hotel-staff receives a military training course. 

From 1969 to 1981 the Thong Nhat Hotel is home to several embassies and UN agencies, due to reconstruction of almost all public buildings all over Hanoi, the hotel accommodated different diplomatic representatives:
   Sweden (1970 – 1971)
   Australia (1973 – 1976)
   Switzerland (1973 – 1976)	
   Japan (09/1973)
   Italy (1975 – 1981)	
   Germany (04/1976 – 12/80)	
   Israel (04/1994 – 08/1995)
   Norway  (1996 – 2005)
   Luxembourg (01/2004 – 02/ 2007)
   Finland
   The Netherlands
   NHCR (03/1975 –07/1979)
   UNDP (1977 – 1980)
   FAO (1978 – 1980)

1980s

After the Vietnam War was over, several ideas are evaluated to restart tourism business and to operate the hotel. In 1987, the Pullman Hotels chain enters into a joint venture with the Vietnamese government to restore the hotel to international standards.

1990s

The hotel is completely rebuilt, regaining the name Metropole and reopening on 8 March 1992, as the Pullman Hotel Metropole. The hotel later is handed over to the Sofitel chain, and finally becomes the Sofitel Legend Metropole Hanoi.

The new 135-room Opera Wing is added from 1994 to 1996, along with the Metropole Center office tower. The offices are converted to additional hotel rooms in 2008.

2000s

During 2005, major renovations include guest rooms in the historical wing as well as the main entrance and the lobby.

As of 2007, the hotel was owned as an equal joint venture between the Hanoitourist Corporation and the Indotel Limited private equity firm.

In 2009, Le Spa du Metropole opens.

In 2011, the ‘Bunker’, the hotel's air raid shelter, is rediscovered under the Bamboo Bar. Blind light bulbs and yellowish painted walls survived decades of flooding by ground water. It is restored to be visited by interested tourists.

The hotel was also used as a venue for the second meeting between US President Donald Trump and North Korean Supreme Leader Kim Jong Un on 27 and 28 February 2019.

Rooms and suites
The hotel includes 364 rooms, which are divided into two wings. The historic Metropole Wing dating back to 1901 was inspired by classic French architecture blended with local Vietnamese style. The Metropole wing has 106 guest rooms.

Restaurants and bars

The hotel has three restaurants and three bars.

Notable residents and guests

 Writers Somerset Maugham and Graham Greene
 Politicians: 
François Mitterrand, Jacques Chirac, François Hollande, George H. W. Bush, Bill Clinton, Vladimir Putin, Fidel Castro, John Kerry, John McCain, Michael D. Higgins, Ban Ki-Moon, Erna Solberg, Queen Máxima of the Netherlands during state visits
 Donald Trump and Kim Jong-un (not staying guests, the hotel was the meeting place for the 2019 Hanoi Summit)
 Actors: 
 Charlie Chaplin and Paulette Goddard on their honeymoon
 Robert De Niro, Catherine Deneuve, Michael Caine
 Singers Joan Baez and Jane Fonda

Managers in History 
   1901 	Edouard Lion,
   1905 	Perrichel,
   1933 	Jean Boeuf,
   1936 	Brunelière,
   1940 	Louis Blouet,
   1942–46     Jean Melandré,
   1946 	Giu Sinh Hoi,
   1954 	Cam,
   1955 	Luu Dinh Dien,
   1969–1972  Luu Thien Ly, 
   1991 	Ricardo Perran, 
   1996 	Richard Kaldor, 
   2000 	Franck Lafourcade,
   2005 	Philippe Bissig,
   2005 	Gilles Cretallaz, 
   2008	Kai Speth,
   2013 	Franck Lafourcade,
   2017 	William J. Haandrikman,

Literature 

Augustin, Andreas, Hotel Metropole Hanoi (1998), The history of; 160 pages, Classic Edition: The Most Famous Hotels in the World 
Augustin, Andreas, The Amazing Tale of the Fabulous Hotel Metropole – the Sofitel Legend of Hanoi (2019)

Gallery

References

Hotels in Hanoi
French colonial architecture in Vietnam
Hotel buildings completed in 1901
Hotels established in 1901
1900s establishments in Vietnam
Sofitel